Patrick Freivald (born October 5, 1976 in Omaha, Nebraska) is an American horror and thriller author who has published six novels and more than a dozen short stories. He lives in western New York with his wife.

Awards
In 2015, the Horror Writers Association awarded him the Richard Laymon President's Award.
His novels Black Tide and Jade Sky were finalists for the Bram Stoker Award for Best Novel (in 2015 and 2014, respectively). "Special Dead" was a finalist for the 2013 Bram Stoker Award for Best Young Adult Novel, and Snapshot, a short story published in the Blood and Roses anthology, published by Scarlett River Press was a finalist for the 2013 Bram Stoker Award for Short Fiction.

Bibliography

Novels and graphic novels
Patrick Freivald's Ani Romero novel series comprises two novels (Twice Shy and Special Dead) published by Journalstone and one novella (Love Bites) published by Pterotype Digital. Barking Deer Press republished his Matt Rowley series which consists of four novels: Jade Sky and Black Tide (originally published by Journalstone), Jade Gods (originally published by Cohesion Press), and the fourth in the series titled Jade Scars published by Barking Deer Press. Jade Sky was ported into graphic format with Joe McKinney and published as a 4-part series in Dark Discoveries magazine (2014-2015). He co-wrote the novel Blood List (Journalstone, 2013) with his twin brother Philip Freivald.

Collection of short fiction
In the Garden of Rusting Gods: A Collection, published 2019, Barking Deer Press

Short fiction

Snapshot (in Blood and Roses, Scarlett River Press, 2013) and as an audiobook (in Tales to Terrify, No. 120, District of Wonders, 2014)
 The Red Man (in Deathlehem Revisited, Grinning Skull Press, 2013)
 A Taste for Life (in Demonic Visions: 50 Horror Tales, Book 1, 2014)
 Outside (in Demonic Visions: 50 Horror Tales, Book 2, 2013)
 Fall (in Demonic Visions: 50 Horror Tales, Book 3, 2013)
 Trigger Warning (in Demonic Visions: 50 Horror Tales, Book 4, 2014)
 Twelve Kilos (in Qualia Nous, Written Backwards, 2014)
 Forward Base Fourteen (in Never Fear, 13Thirty Books, 2015)
 Taps (in Never Fear, 13Thirty Books, 2015)
 Bonked (in SNAFU: Hunters, Cohesion Press, 2016)
 Splinter (in SQ Mag, Edition 27, IFWG Publishing, 2016)
 The Star (in The Tarot, 13Thirty Books, 2016)
 Control (in Uncharted Worlds: Xeno Encounters, 13Thirty Books, 2016)
 Shorted (in The Apocalypse, 13Thirty Books, 2017)
 Roadkill (in Double Barrel Horror Volume 2, Pint Bottle Press, 2017)
 The Gateway (in Double Barrel Horror Volume 2, Pint Bottle Press, 2017)
 Earl Pruitt's Smoker (in Behold! Oddities, Curiosities, and Undefinable Wonders, Crystal Lake Publishing, 2017)
 The Chosen Place (in A New York State of Fright', Hippocampus Press, 2018)

Other

 In 2016, he chaired the Horror Writers Association's Bram Stoker Award for Lifetime Achievement jury.
 He is a member of the Horror Writers Association and the International Thriller Writers association.
 He was an instructor at the StokerCon Horror University, 2016-2019.
 He is President Emeritus of the Ontario Finger Lakes Beekeepers Association.
 He teaches high school classes in Physics, Robotics, and American Sign Language; and he taught Physics at Rochester Institute of Technology and ASL at Genesee Community College.
 He has served as a coach to the FIRST Robotics Competition Team 1551, The Grapes of Wrath,'' since 2005.

See also
List of horror fiction authors

References

External links
 
 
 Ontario Finger Lakes Beekeepers Association

1976 births
Living people
20th-century American novelists
21st-century American novelists
American horror writers
Writers from New York (state)
20th-century American short story writers
21st-century American short story writers
Novelists from New York (state)